Nancy Guillemette is a Canadian politician, who was elected to the National Assembly of Quebec in a byelection on December 10, 2018. She represents the electoral district of Roberval as a member of the Coalition Avenir Québec.

References

Living people
Coalition Avenir Québec MNAs
21st-century Canadian politicians
Women MNAs in Quebec
21st-century Canadian women politicians
1969 births